, known professionally as , is a Japanese talent, actress, and a former singer.

Arihara began her career as a trainee of the umbrella idol group Hello! Project and later debuted as a member of Cute in 2006. After departing from the group in 2009, she ventured into modeling and acting.

Career

2004-2009: Cute
Arihara was born in Yokohama, Kanagawa, and joined Hello! Project in 2004 as part of the Hello! Pro Egg. Then she joined Tomoiki Ki o Uetai from 2005 until 2006, where she moved on to the current group, Cute.

On February 26, 2009, Hello! Project announced that Arihara was having difficulty performing onstage due to having hallux valgus, or bunion deformity and would also be absent from more Hello! Project activities, including activities in Cute, while receiving treatment. During her hiatus, Hello! Project announced in July that she had left the group and would not be returning in the future.

2010-present: Modeling and acting career
In 2010, Arihara returned to entertainment and was signed into a model/talent agency called Blue Rose. She soon departed from Blue Rose and signed with Toki Entertainment.

Personal life
In 2008, the September issue of the tabloid magazine BUBKA reported that Arihara had gone on a date to see the movie Hana Yori Dango: Final with Ryosuke Hashimoto, a member of Johnny's Jr. This affected her image, as soon after the publication, at a Cute handshake meeting, some fans refused to shake Arihara's hand, making her cry in the middle of the event. Excite.co.jp linked this publication with Arihara's sudden departure from Cute. Hashimoto, on the other hand, despite rumors of an upcoming penitence, was promoted to A.B.C-Z shortly afterwards.

Discography

Filmography

Television

Theater

References

External links 
 °C-ute: Official Hello! Project profile 
 Kanna's Official Blog 

Living people
1993 births
Japanese television personalities
Japanese female idols
21st-century Japanese actresses
People from Yokohama
Cute (Japanese idol group) members
Musicians from Kanagawa Prefecture